Michael Fenton Stevens (born 12 February 1958) is an English actor and comedian. He is best known for being a founder member of The Hee Bee Gee Bees and the voice behind the Spitting Image 1986 number 1 hit "The Chicken Song". He also starred in KYTV, its Radio 4 predecessor, Radio Active and Benidorm as Sir Henry since Series 4 which was first broadcast in 2011, and as an anchor on 3rd & Bird on CBeebies.

Career
Fenton Stevens featured in regular roles as Hank in the 1996 series The Legacy of Reginald Perrin, and as Ralph in Andy Hamilton's 2003 television sitcom Trevor's World of Sport, as well as in the Radio 4 version of the latter which was broadcast in 2004. Stevens had previously appeared in a guest role in Drop the Dead Donkey, another television comedy series written by Hamilton, and appears regularly in various roles in Hamilton's Radio 4 sitcom Old Harry's Game. He has also featured in Ian Hislop's sitcom My Dad's the Prime Minister as the Home Secretary. He plays the eponymous Inspector Steine in Lynne Truss' long-running Radio 4 comedy series. From 2004 until 2005 he appeared in two series of Julia Davis's dark comedy series Nighty Night as the Reverend Gordon Fox. He also appeared in various roles in the Tertiary, Quandary and Quintessential Phases of the Hitchhiker's Guide to the Galaxy radio series. In 2007, he played the similarly named Michael Wenton Weeks in Dirk Gently's Holistic Detective Agency. He has provided the voice of Mr Beakman, a toucan, in the CBeebies show 3rd & Bird. He has a recurring role in the sitcom My Family as Mr Griffith, the boss of the dental corporation "Cavitex". He has played Sir Henry in Benidorm since Series 4 which was first broadcast in 2011. 

Notable guest appearances have been as the next door hotel guest in "Mr. Bean in Room 426"; and alongside Hee Bee Gee Bees bandmate Angus Deayton as the brother-in-law of Deayton's character in an episode of One Foot in the Grave. He played Alan Perkins, a holiday rep in Spain in "The Unlucky Winner Is" episode of Only Fools And Horses. He played a guest role in Coronation Street in November 2004. In 2006, he guest-starred in the Doctor Who audio adventure The Kingmaker. He also appeared in Series 3 Episode 3 of Outnumbered, as a substitute player called 'Lance' in a tennis match, and in the "Music 2000" episode of Look Around You as the chairman of the Royal Pop and Rock Association. In 2022 he appeared as Tony Vanoli in a fourth season episode of Ghosts. 

He is a very successful Pantomime Dame, having written and appeared in a number of pantos over the years. From December 2006 until January 2007, he starred in and wrote the Cambridge Arts Theatre pantomime version of Aladdin in the role of Widow Twankey. In 2015, Stevens appeared as Dr. John Radcliffe in the Royal Shakespeare Company's production of Helen Edmundson's Queen Anne.

Since 2020, with help from his son John Fenton Stevens, a series of podcasts have been released called My Time Capsule with guests such as Stephen Fry, Rebecca Front, Rick Wakeman, Mark Gatiss, Rufus Hound, David Mitchell, Anthony Head, Chris Addison, Rev Richard Coles, Griff Rhys Jones, Richard Herring and David Baddiel.

Personal life
In 2014, his mother, Olive Stevens, was accidentally killed by her own car when another motorist attempted to help her turn her vehicle around after fly-tipped rubbish blocked her path. She fell and hit her head which caused a bleed on the brain causing her death in hospital.

References

External links

1958 births
Fenton Stevens, Michael
Fenton Stevens, Michael
The Hee Bee Gee Bees members
English male radio actors